National Route 273 is a national highway of Japan connecting Obihiro, Hokkaidō and Monbetsu, Hokkaidō in Japan, with a total length of 235.2 km (146.15 mi).

References

National highways in Japan
Roads in Hokkaido